Word Up also known as Word Soup is a popular SWP (skill with prize) game. Located on the itbox and other terminals, the game was developed by Big Fizz Games.

Overview and gameplay

Similar to other word games such as Scrabble, Boggle, and Bookworm; the object of the game is to create valid words from a randomised selection of letter tiles arranged in a 13x9 matrix. Each word scores points according to the letters used therein (sum of all letters) multiplied by the total number of letters in the word. points from all words entered are accumulated.
Hence the word LAVA would score .

The hierarchy of letters is similar to that of Scrabble; Q and Z are the highest-scoring tiles (each 10) followed by X and J (each 8) and so on, the most notable variance is that here L is worth five as opposed to just one in Scrabble. The player starts with two minutes to find as many words as he can; if he manages to use Q, Z, X, or J in any word he is awarded a further 10 seconds. After each successful entry the letters used are discarded with the matrix replacing those letters used with surrounding tiles from above and to the left, a void is thus formed to the top left of the game screen. There is an additional 500-point bonus awarded for clearing the grids with allowable words.

National tournament and reissue as Word Soup

A tournament running on the itbox terminal ended on 22 April 2007. Prizes available for this national tournament included £1000 for the player with the highest final score achieved over the course of the tournament and 49 other cash prizes. This tournament was won by VAJINALBOB Word Soup National High Score Boards

A reincarnation of the game was brought out in August 2007 with the name Word Soup; gameplay is all-but identical to the previous issue. the game's wordlist has undergone some seemingly minor improvements and arrows appear connecting selected letters, aside from this Word Soup can be considered as synonymous with the Word Up described herein.

Prizes

Word Up is legally classified as a "skill with prizes" (SWP) game and therefore is not considered gambling. Each game costs 50 pence and prizes available are £1, £2, £3, £4, £5, £6, £8 and the £10 jackpot on a progressive basis of supersession. (Previous versions of the game advertised a £20 jackpot). Much of the appeal of the game, however, is not in the gambling potential but in the creation of top scores which remain on the site until they can be beaten by another player.

High score categories

There are four hi-score tables locked to the specific location: Total Score, Longest Word, Highest Scoring Word and Most Words. The only of these categories which is (realistically) bounded is Most Words for which the highest possible score is 39 (39 three-letter words uses all 117 tiles in the matrix). In each of the other categories, it is possible to improve regardless of the level of expertise leading to considerable replayability.

In addition to the localised scoreboards there is a national website dedicated to collecting the highest scores in one resource (see links below).

PC version

A PC version of the game has been produced by the makers, and is known as Puzzle Word.  The PC version is identical in almost every detail.  The only noticeable differences occur with the in-game dictionary and the length of each timed game (5 minutes as opposed to the 2 in Word Up).  While not offering exactly the same experience due to the aforementioned differences, the PC version does act as a useful (and free) training aid, allowing strategies and techniques to be honed.  The PC version is available online to download as a demo and can also be purchased ($20) for unrestricted play.  The demo has a 60-minute time limit.  The PC version also has two additional modes which the pub version does not (for obvious reasons) include; these are the Brain Game and the Single Game.  The Single Game works just as a normal Word Up game, except there is no time limit – this allows the grid to be studied in depth, allowing for long and complex word creation. The object of the Brain Game is to create a number of words to reach a point's target.  Once that target is reached then the length of the various words made is converted into new blocks (each 3 letter word = 1 block, each 4 letter word = 2 blocks etc.).  These new blocks are then added, a new points target is set and the game continues in this fashion until you have run out of blocks or cannot make any words with those left.

Xbox 360 version

On 19 November 2008 Word Soup was launched on the Xbox 360 Community Games channel.  It has the same game modes as the PC version but allows you to shuffle as much as you like.  It also sports a graphical refresh. It's available for 400 MS Points XBLA Xbox 360 version

Mobile and tablet version
In February 2013, Word Soup was launched on the BlackBerry 10 and BlackBerry PlayBook. The 2012 version sports updated graphics, a new soundtrack and the Single Game is now renamed as Relaxed Mode. The new version also has a tilt feature where if the player tilts their handset, available letter tiles slide across the board to the other side, offering new word making opportunities New Feature list

The mobile and tablet versions of Word Soup also feature global high score tables through Scoreloop or Game Center, depending upon the platform.

External links
BigFizz Puzzle Word Webpage – Developers of Game
Word Soup National High Scores

Word games
2003 video games